This is a list of fictional castles.

Anvil Castle, from The Elder Scrolls IV: Oblivion
Blandings Castle, from P. G. Wodehouse's stories
Castle Adamant, from Princess Ida
Castle Amber, from The Chronicles of Amber
Castle Bravil, from The Elder Scrolls IV: Oblivion
Castle Bruma, from The Elder Scrolls IV: Oblivion
Castle Bunthorne, from Patience
Castle Chorrol, from The Elder Scrolls IV: Oblivion
Castle Dour, from The Elder Scrolls V: Skyrim
Castle Duckula, the home of Count Duckula
The Castle of Ultimate Darkness, from Time Bandits
The Crystal Castle, from the TV series She-Ra: Princess of Power
Castle Grayskull, from the He-Man Masters of the Universe cartoon series
Castle Kvatch, from The Elder Scrolls IV: Oblivion
Castle Leyawiin, from The Elder Scrolls IV: Oblivion
Castle Skingrad, from The Elder Scrolls IV: Oblivion
Castle Volkihar, from The Elder Scrolls V: Skyrim
Castle Wolfenstein, from the Wolfenstein series
Castle Wyvern, in Gargoyles
Cheydinhal Castle, from The Elder Scrolls IV: Oblivion
Disney Castle, from Kingdom Hearts II
Doubting Castle, from The Pilgrim's Progress
Dragonswatch, from The Elder Scrolls V: Skyrim
Eichenwalde, from Overwatch
Fort Dawnguard, from The Elder Scrolls V: Skyrim
Hagedorn Castle, the titular castle from The Last Castle by Jack Vance
Katz Kastle, from Courage the Cowardly Dog
Kiamo Ko, from The Wicked Years
Lord Valentine's Castle, from the Majipoor series by Robert Silverberg
Marlinspike Hall, from The Adventures of Tintin
Mistveil Keep, from The Elder Scrolls V: Skyrim
Monsalvat, the castle of the Knights of the Grail in Wagner's operas Parsifal and Lohengrin
Osohe Castle, in Mother 3
Palace of the Kings, from The Elder Scrolls V: Skyrim
Ruddigore Castle, from Ruddigore
Shimada Castle, from Overwatch
James Castle, from Terranova Defense
The Blue Palace, from The Elder Scrolls V: Skyrim
The Royal Castle, in the Sonic the Hedgehog series
The titular castle from The Castle of Otranto
Torquilstone, from Ivanhoe
Udolpho, from Ann Radcliffe's The Mysteries of Udolpho
Understone Keep, from The Elder Scrolls V: Skyrim
Yalding Towers, from The Enchanted Castle
Castle Ravenloft, from the Dungeons and Dragons adventure module written by Tracy and Laura Hickman

A
Aberwyvern Castle, from the 1983 book Castle by David Macaulay and from its companion 1986 PBS program
The Adamant Tower, from The Amber Spyglass

C
Castle Dracula, from Bram Stoker's Dracula
Castle Caladan, from Dune
The Clouded Mountain, from The Amber Spyglass
Kaer Morhen, from The Witcher
D
The Dark Tower, from The Dark Tower by Stephen King

G
Gormenghast from the Gormenghast series of novels

H
Hogwarts Castle, from the Harry Potter series
 Howl's Moving Castle, from Howl's Moving Castle by Diana Wynne Jones

R
Rosengåva, from Skuggserien by Maria Gripe

T
Titular castle from The Castle by Franz Kafka

:

Castamere from A Song of Ice and Fire by George R. R. Martin
Casterly Rock from A Song of Ice and Fire by George R. R. Martin
Castle Black, from A Song of Ice and Fire by George R. R. Martin 
Dragonstone, from A Song of Ice and Fire by George R. R. Martin
The Eyrie, from A Song of Ice and Fire by George R. R. Martin
Harrenhal, from A Song of Ice and Fire by George R. R. Martin
The Hightower, from A Song of Ice and Fire by George R. R. Martin
Highgarden, from A Song of Ice and Fire by George R. R. Martin
Pyke, from A Song of Ice and Fire by George R. R. Martin
The Red Keep, from A Song of Ice and Fire by George R. R. Martin
Riverrun, from A Song of Ice and Fire by George R. R. Martin
Storms End, from A Song of Ice and Fire by George R. R. Martin
Sunspear, from A Song of Ice and Fire by George R. R. Martin
Winterfell, from A Song of Ice and Fire by George R. R. Martin

Anvard, from The Chronicles of Narnia by C. S. Lewis
Cair Paravel, from The Chronicles of Narnia by C. S. Lewis
White Witch's Castle, from The Chronicles of Narnia by C. S. Lewis

Amon Sûl, from The Lord of the Rings by J. R. R. Tolkien
Barad-dûr, from The Lord of the Rings by J. R. R. Tolkien
Dol Guldur, from The Lord of the Rings by J. R. R. Tolkien
Isengard, from The Lord of the Rings by J. R. R. Tolkien
The Hornburg, from The Lord of the Rings by J. R. R. Tolkien
Minas Tirith, from The Lord of the Rings by J. R. R. Tolkien
Minas Morgul (formerly Minas Ithil), from The Lord of the Rings by J. R. R. Tolkien

C
Castlevania, the Count Dracula's castle in the Castlevania video game series

:

The Elder Scrolls

 Anvil Castle, from The Elder Scrolls IV: Oblivion
 Castle Bravil, from The Elder Scrolls IV: Oblivion
 Castle Bruma, from The Elder Scrolls IV: Oblivion
 Castle Chorrol, from The Elder Scrolls IV: Oblivion
 Castle Dour, from The Elder Scrolls V: Skyrim
 Castle Kvatch, from The Elder Scrolls IV: Oblivion
 Castle Leyawiin, from The Elder Scrolls IV: Oblivion
 Castle Skingrad, from The Elder Scrolls IV: Oblivion
 Castle Volkihar, from The Elder Scrolls V: Skyrim
 Cheydinhal Castle, from The Elder Scrolls IV: Oblivion
 Dragonsreach, from The Elder Scrolls V: Skyrim
 Fort Dawnguard, from The Elder Scrolls V: Skyrim
 Mistveil Keep, from The Elder Scrolls V: Skyrim
 Palace of the Kings, from The Elder Scrolls V: Skyrim
 The Blue Palace, from The Elder Scrolls V: Skyrim
 Understone Keep, from The Elder Scrolls V: Skyrim

Bowser's Castle, from the Mario franchise series.
Castle Bleck, from Super Paper Mario
Princess Peach's Castle, from the Mario series

Hyrule Castle, from The Legend of Zelda

B
The Bombursts Castle in Vulgaria, from the film Chitty Chitty Bang Bang

C'
Castle Aaaaarrrggh!, from the 1975 film Monty Python and the Holy Grail

H
Howl's Moving Castle (film) by Studio Ghibli
L
Laputa: Castle in the Sky by Hayao Miyazaki

C
Camelot, from Arthurian legend

Lego
Lego Monster Fighters Vampyre Castle.

See also
List of castles

References

Stefan. (September 4, 2014). https://towerofthehand.com/blog/2014/09/04-castles-of-westeros/noscript.html Retrieved April 6, 2018

 
Fictional
Castles